Dimu (also Romanized as Dīmū, Dīmaow, and Dīmow; also known as Deymāb) is a village in Abezhdan Rural District, Abezhdan District, Andika County, Khuzestan Province, Iran. At the 2006 census, its population was 129, in 23 families.

References 

Populated places in Andika County